is a 2022 Japanese animated science fiction action adventure film based on the Sword Art Online: Progressive light novels written by Reki Kawahara and illustrated by abec and a sequel to the 2021 film Sword Art Online Progressive: Aria of a Starless Night. The staff and cast from the first film reprised their roles, including production by A-1 Pictures and direction by Ayako Kōno, with character designs by Kento Toya and music by Yuki Kajiura. It was released on October 22, 2022.

Voice cast

Plot
Two months have passed since the deadly game began, and Kirito and Asuna continue to make progress. They stop for treasure, but then they must face Asuna's least favorite monster.

Production
Shortly after the release of Sword Art Online Progressive: Aria of a Starless Night, a sequel film and its title was announced, with its release set for 2022. The staff and cast from the previous film reprised their roles, such as production by A-1 Pictures and direction by Ayako Kōno, with character designs by Kento Toya and music by Yuki Kajiura. Eir Aoi performed the film's main theme, .

The film adapted the fourth volume of the light novel series due to one of the overarching storylines of the series not being completed.

Release
The film was initially set to have an advance screening on August 24, 2022, before a full theatrical release on September 10. However, the release was delayed to October 22 due to the COVID-19 pandemic in Japan. Aniplex of America licensed the film for release in North America and Canada on February 3, 2023.

Reception 

Richard Eisenbeis of the Anime News Network gave the film a 'C+' rating, praising the world-building, production, and soundtrack, but criticizing its over-reliance to the same tropes presented in its prequel, making the film "both more predictable and less emotionally powerful." Writing for The Guardian, Phil Hoad gave the film two out of five stars, praising its action sequences and animation, but criticizing its plot, noting "there is precious little ambition here beyond what feels like a clunky and redundant transposition of the videogaming experience." Meanwhile, Nick Valdez of Comic Book Resources gave it a positive review, praising its production and characters, but noted that the film is for longtime viewers and fans of the Sword Art Online franchise.

References

External links
  
 
 

2022 films
2022 anime films
2020s Japanese-language films
A-1 Pictures
Anime films based on light novels
Anime films composed by Yuki Kajiura
Aniplex
Augmented reality in fiction
Fiction about memory erasure and alteration
Films about video games
Films about virtual reality
Films based on Japanese novels
Japanese animated science fiction films
Massively multiplayer online role-playing games in fiction
O